Teddington Hockey Club is a field hockey club based at Teddington School, Teddington in the London Borough of Richmond upon Thames. The club is one of the oldest in the world after being formed in 1871; the club advertise that they are the oldest in the world  but the claim is disputed by the Blackheath Hockey Club.

Teddington runs a large number of teams including eight men's team and seven women's teams. The Men's first X1 play in the Men's England Hockey League Division One South.

National Honours
The club has gained significant honours -
 1994-95 National League Champions
 1996-97 National League Runner-up
 1993-94 Cup winners
 1996-97 Cup winners

Men's International players past and present
Ali Wilson - England & GB (Beijing 2008, London 2012)
 Matt Daly - England & GB (Beijing 2008, London 2012)
Jason Laslett - England & GB (Barcelona 1992, Atlanta 1996)
Calum Giles - England & GB (Atlanta 1996, Sydney 2000)
Brett Garrard - England & GB (Sydney 2000, Athens 2004)
Jimmy Wallis - England & GB (Athens 2004)
Phil McGuire - England & GB (Atlanta 1996)
Simon Nicklin - England & GB (Barcelona 1992)
 Rob Moore - England & GB (London 2012)
 Danny Haydon - England
 Chua Boon Huat - Malaysia
 Jon Ebsworth - England
 Tyrone Moore - Wales
Clyde Camburn - England
 Russell Benzies - Scotland
 Tony Colclough - Wales
 Tim Walker - Scotland
Robbie Martin - Wales
 Mark Woodbridge - England
 Sunil Unka - New Zealand
 George Cover - England
 Rhys Docherty - Wales
 Nicholas Samra - Scotland
 Murray Collins - Scotland (Current)
 Ed Greaves - Scotland (Current)
 Rory McCallum - Scotland (Current)
 Kyle White - Scotland (Current)
 Joe McConnell - Scotland (Current)

Women's International players past and present 

 Michelle Mitchell - Australia (Atlanta 1996)

References

 
English field hockey clubs
Field hockey clubs established in 1871
1871 establishments in England